"Airborne Bells"/"Is Suicide A Solution?" is a 7" vinyl single by Coil The single was number 22 of a series from "Clawfist Singles Club", with catalogue number XPIG 22.

Release history
It was released in an edition believed to be between 1250 and 1400 copies. 

The front cover lists the track name "Airborne Bells", while the vinyl label erroneously refers to the song as "Airbourne Bells".

"Is Suicide A Solution?" is an expanded and remixed version of "Who'll Fall" from Stolen & Contaminated Songs.

The opening lyrics are "I am the loneliest link in a very strange chain." The closing lyrics, played backwards, are "When the gods want to punish you, they answer your prayers..."

The vinyl is etched as follows:
 Side A: HALOGEN REFRACTED THROUGH KERATIN
 Side B: ...UNBORN SMELLS

Track listing
Side A:
 "Airborne Bells" – 5:21
Side B:
 "Is Suicide a Solution?" – 5:21

References

External links
 
 
 Airborne Bells/Is Suicide a Solution? at Brainwashed

1993 singles
Coil (band) songs